Heemstede-Aerdenhout is a railway station in Heemstede and Aerdenhout, Netherlands. The station opened on 1 October 1891 and is located on the site of the old Toll house for the Leidsevaart canal, which still flows next to the station from Haarlem to Leiden. This canal still follows the Oude Lijn (Amsterdam - Rotterdam) closely. The train soon became the favored method of travel after the station opened, and the canal has gone out of use since the end of the second world war. The current station building was opened in 1958 and was one of the first Dutch viaduct stations.

Train services

, the following train services call at this station:
2x per hour intercity service Amsterdam - Rotterdam - Roosendaal - Vlissingen
2x per hour intercity service Amsterdam - Haarlem - Leiden - The Hague
2x per hour local service (sprinter) The Hague - Leiden - Haarlem

Bus services

3: IJmuiden - Haarlem - Schalkwijk
4: Heemstede De Glip - Heemstede-Aerdenhout station
80: Amsterdam - Haarlem - Zandvoort
90: Haarlem - Noordwijk - Den Haag

References

External links

NS website 
Dutch Public Transport journey planner 
Connexxion website 

Railway stations in North Holland
Railway stations opened in 1891
Railway stations on the Oude Lijn
Bloemendaal
Heemstede